Baron Tenterden, of Hendon in the County of Middlesex, was a title in the Peerage of the United Kingdom. It was created in 1827 for Sir Charles Abbott, Lord Chief Justice of the King's Bench from 1818 to 1832. His grandson, the third Baron (who succeeded his uncle), was Permanent Under-Secretary of State for Foreign Affairs between 1873 and 1882. The title became extinct on the death of the third Baron's son, the fourth Baron, in 1939.

Barons Tenterden (1827)
Charles Abbott, 1st Baron Tenterden (1762–1832)
John Henry Abbott, 2nd Baron Tenterden (1796–1870)
Hon. Charles Abbott (1803-1838)
Charles Stuart Aubrey Abbott, 3rd Baron Tenterden (1834–1882)
Charles Stuart Henry Abbott, 4th Baron Tenterden (1865–1939)

Arms

References

Extinct baronies in the Peerage of the United Kingdom
1827 establishments in the United Kingdom
Noble titles created in 1827